La Colmena Airport,  is an airport  southeast of Traiguén, a town in the La Araucanía Region of Chile.

See also

Transport in Chile
List of airports in Chile

References

External links
OpenStreetMap - La Colmena
OurAirports - La Colmena Airport
SkyVector - La Colmena Airport

Airports in Chile
Airports in La Araucanía Region